Carol C. Juneau (born May 5, 1945) is an American politician and educator who served as a member of both branches of the Montana Legislature from 1998 to 2011.

Early life and education 
Juneau was born in White Shield, North Dakota. She earned a Bachelor of Arts degree from Eastern Montana College and a Master of Education from the University of Montana.

Career 
Juneau was the director of the Blackfeet Community Free School from 1974 to 1976 and president of the Blackfeet Community College from 1976 to 1983. She has also worked as an education consultant and member of the Montana Indian Democrats Council. She was the vice chair of the Glacier County, Montana Democratic Central Committee.

In 1998, Juneau became a member of Montana House of Representatives, serving until 2005.

In 2006, Juneau became a member of Montana Senate.

Personal life 
Juneau and her husband, Stan, have two children. Juneau and her family live in Browning, Montana. One of Juneau's daughter is Denise Juneau, the former Montana superintendent of public instruction.

References

1945 births
Living people
Democratic Party members of the Montana House of Representatives
Democratic Party Montana state senators
Women state legislators in Montana
People from Browning, Montana
20th-century American politicians
20th-century American women politicians
21st-century American politicians
21st-century American women politicians
People from McLean County, North Dakota
University of Montana alumni
Montana State University Billings alumni